The Industrialist is the eighth studio album by American heavy metal band Fear Factory, released on June 5, 2012.

Overview
The Industrialist marks the band's return to the concept album. Burton C. Bell said about the album, "the protagonist (The Industrialist) is the incarnation of all industries in the form of an automaton. The mechanical, technological, and scientific advances through the industrial age led to the creation of The Industrialist. In the story, the automaton becomes sentient as it collects memories with each passing day. Through observation and learning, it gains the will to exist. What was meant to help man, will eventually be man's demise." According to Cazares, the title was taken from a documentary the band saw about the people who developed "the engines for war machines", and God Eater was a name Bell saw on a toybox while traveling.

The album was recorded with Bell and Cazares as the only two credited members of the band, while Rhys Fulber once again produced and received additional writing credits. No live drummer was used on the album, with the band instead opting for programmed drums with help from John Sankey of Devolved, who was also credited. The band's drummer at the time, Gene Hoglan, wasn't informed of this decision and left the band after learning about the album's completion without him online.

Editions
There are four different editions available: a regular jewel case with 10 tracks, a digi-book available in North America containing two bonus tracks and the album's concept as written by Burton C. Bell included in the booklet. There are two editions exclusive in Europe; the first being a regular digipak with two bonus tracks, and the second being a limited fan box containing a stand-alone mask containing the digipak and a certificate, limited to 1,000 copies worldwide. The story is omitted from the European releases. However, once all 'special editions' are out of print, the band intends to make the conceptual story book on the North American 'special edition' release available in PDF format on the band's website. The Japanese edition comes with an acoustic version of "Timelessness" from Obsolete, dubbed "Timelessness II".

Reception

The album has received generally positive reviews from music critics and band fans. Gregory Heaney of AllMusic gave the album a mixed response with a rating of 3 out of 5. Heaney felt that The Industrialist brought absolutely nothing new, stating "anyone hoping for more of the same old Fear Factory will find a lot to love about The Industrialist, those who have been hoping for something different might find that the album isn't quite what they were looking for."

Track listing

Personnel
Fear Factory
 Burton C. Bell – vocals, co-production, composing, lyric writing, vocal arrangement, arrangement
 Dino Cazares – guitars, bass, drum programming, drum writing, drum arrangement, co-production, composing, arrangement

Additional personnel
 Rhys Fulber - production, enhanced soundscape programming, keyboard arrangement, additional vocal arrangement, vocal editing, arrangement (2-7 & 10)
 Logan Mader – additional tracking, digital editing, additional vocal arrangement, vocal editing, guitar recording, bass recording, additional vocal recording
 Greg Reely - mixing, mastering
 Joey Blush - additional keyboard programming, production on "Blush Response (Difference Engine remix)"
 Damian "The Frog" Rainaud – additional keyboard programming, assistant engineering, drum editing
 Alan "Ace" Bergman – guitar tech
 Brian Harrah – additional guitars
 John Sankey - drum programming, drum writing, drum arrangement
 Anthony Clarkson - artwork

Charts

References

Fear Factory albums
2012 albums
Concept albums
Tragic Hero Records albums
Candlelight Records albums
Albums produced by Rhys Fulber